Kalaymyo Airport  is an international airport serving Kalaymyo (a.k.a. Kalay or Kalemyo), a town in the Sagaing Division of Myanmar. This airport is the only one located in the middle of the town.

Airlines and destinations

References

External links
 
 

Airports in Myanmar